The 2000 season of Úrvalsdeild was the 89th season of league football in Iceland. KR defended their title. Stjarnan and Leiftur were relegated. The competition was known as Símadeild due to its sponsorship by Icelandic telecommunications company, Síminn.

KR's Andri Sigþórsson was the top scorer with 14 goals.

Final league position

Results
Each team played every opponent once home and away for a total of 18 matches.

References

Úrvalsdeild karla (football) seasons
1
Iceland
Iceland